The 1964 Cal Poly Mustangs football team represented California Polytechnic State College—now known as California Polytechnic State University, San Luis Obispo—as a member of the California Collegiate Athletic Association (CCAA) during the 1964 NCAA College Division football season. Led by third-year head coach Sheldon Harden, Cal Poly compiled an overall record of 0–10 with a mark of 0–5 in conference play, placing last out of six teams in the CCAA. The Mustangs played home games at Mustang Stadium in San Luis Obispo, California.

Schedule

Team players in the NFL
No Cal Poly Mustangs were selected in the 1965 NFL Draft. However, one player who played for Cal Poly in 1964 then transferred to San Diego State was selected in the 1967 NFL Draft.

References

Cal Poly
Cal Poly Mustangs football seasons
Cal Poly Mustangs football